"Best Behaviour" is a song by British singer Louisa Johnson. It was released as a single on 3 March 2017. The track was written by TMS, Shungudzo Kuyimba, and Danny Parker.

Music video 
The music video for "Best Behaviour" was filmed in the desert of Los Angeles. It was directed by Sarah Chatfield, who also directed the music video for Little Mix's "Shout Out to My Ex". Johnson described the video as "quite flirty and very fun at the same time. It's quite up tempo so you can dance to it."

Track listing 
Taken from iTunes.

Commercial performance 
"Best Behaviour" debuted and peaked at number 48 in the UK, spending a total of twelve weeks on the chart. In Scotland, it debuted and peaked at number 22, while reaching number 71 in Ireland.

Charts and certifications

Charts

Certifications

References 

2017 singles
Louisa Johnson songs
2017 songs
Songs written by Tom Barnes (songwriter)
Songs written by Ben Kohn
Songs written by Peter Kelleher (songwriter)
Song recordings produced by TMS (production team)
Songs written by Danny Parker (songwriter)
Syco Music singles
Songs written by Shungudzo